The West Point Story, also known simply as West Point, is a dramatic anthology television series shown in the United States by CBS during the 1956–57 season and by ABC during the 1957–58 season.

History

The West Point Story, produced with the full cooperation of the United States Department of Defense and the United States Military Academy, was said to be based on actual files documenting many of the real-life dramatic occurrences at West Point over the years. Names and dates were altered in order to protect the privacy of the real people portrayed, however.  The program was hosted by a fictional cadet, Charles C. Thompson portrayed by Donald May.

During its second season on ABC, The West Point Story was in competition with NBC's The Californians, set in San Francisco during the California Gold Rush of the 1850s, and with The $64,000 Question quiz series on CBS. The West Point Story was replaced on the summer schedule in 1958 by Jack Wyatt's Confession, which continued to air during the first half of the 1958–1959 season in the 10 p.m. Tuesday evening time slot.

At the time that The West Point Story was broadcast, four other military dramas aired either through syndication or on the major networks: Harbor Command, Navy Log, The Silent Service, and Men of Annapolis.

On February 26, 2013, Timeless Media Group released all 39 available episodes of the series in a four-disc DVD format.

Guest stars

Among those celebrities who made at least one appearance in The West Point Story are: Carolyn Craig, Richard Jaeckel, Dick Sargent, Pat Conway, Chuck Connors, Clint Eastwood, Ron Foster, Barbara Eden, Larry Hagman (miscredited), Hayden Rorke,  Ron Hagerthy, Tyler MacDuff, Steve McQueen, Martin Milner, Larry Pennell, Karen Sharpe, Robert Vaughn and Leonard Nimoy as Tom Kennedy.

Writers

Gene Roddenberry wrote all or part of ten to twelve of the 39 episodes.  Sources differ as to which episodes he should be credited with.

Home media
Timeless Media Group (under license from MGM) released West Point - The Complete TV Series on DVD February 26, 2012.

References

External links
The Long Gray Line - series referenced in book by author and journalist Rick Atkinson.
 
 West Point Story at CVTA with episode list

1950s American anthology television series
1956 American television series debuts
1957 American television series endings
American Broadcasting Company original programming
Black-and-white American television shows
CBS original programming
English-language television shows
Television series by MGM Television
Television shows set in New York (state)
United States Military Academy in fiction